Boromo is a town in the Boromo Department of Balé Province in Burkina Faso. It is the capital of both the department and the province, and it has a population of 20,193 (2019).

Boromo is located directly between the two major cities of Burkina Faso, Ouagadougou and Bobo-Dioulasso. It is a city with many natural resources, including gold and fish. The major activity in this zone is agriculture. Boromo is a "melting pot" where you will find many ethnic groups, including Mossi, Dioula, Dafing, Bobo and Winiens (or Kos).

See also 

 2008 Burkina Faso bus crash
 Railway stations in Burkina Faso

References

External links 
 Satellite map at Maplandia.com
 BBC article about the 2008 road crash

Populated places in the Boucle du Mouhoun Region
Balé Province